Forchbach is a small river of Bavaria, Germany. It flows into the Main in Karlstein am Main.

See also
List of rivers of Bavaria

References

Rivers of Bavaria
Rivers of the Spessart
Rivers of Germany